Euseius bwende is a species of mite in the family Phytoseiidae.

References

bwende
Articles created by Qbugbot
Animals described in 1962